Mathlynn "Mattie" Langtor Sasser-Robert (born December 25, 1996) is a Marshallese-born American weightlifter.

She competed at the 2016 Summer Olympics in the women's 58 kg event, in which she placed eleventh. She was the flag bearer for the Marshall Islands at the Parade of Nations.

Major results

References

External links
 

1996 births
Living people
Marshallese female weightlifters
American female weightlifters
Olympic weightlifters of the Marshall Islands
Weightlifters at the 2016 Summer Olympics
Pan American Games medalists in weightlifting
Pan American Games silver medalists for the United States
Weightlifters at the 2019 Pan American Games
Medalists at the 2019 Pan American Games